"Don't Say Goodbye" is a song by Brazilian musician Sérgio Mendes, featuring vocals from American singer John Legend. was released on August 29, 2014 as the lead single of his nineteen studio album Magic, with the record label OKeh Records. The song was produced by Mendes.

Track listing 
Download digital
Don't Say Goodbye (featuring John Legend) — 3:43

Release history

References

Songs about parting
2014 songs
2014 singles
Bossa nova songs
Samba songs
Jazz songs
Brazilian songs
Sérgio Mendes songs
John Legend songs
Songs written by John Legend
Okeh Records singles